Arreh Furg (also Romanized as Arreh Fūrg; also known as Arfūrk and Arreh) is a village in Darmian Rural District, in the Central District of Darmian County, South Khorasan Province, Iran. At the 2006 census, its population was 148, in 35 families.

References 

Populated places in Darmian County